Breakfast at Fatboys is the debut album by Australian hip hop group Butterfingers, released on 3 May 2004 on the group's own Valley Trash label and distributed by MGM.

The album reached #61 on the ARIA album charts, #15 on the ARIA Australian Release charts and #2 on the AIR (Australian Independent Record Labels Association) Charts where it remained in the top twenty of the AIR charts for over a year following its release. Triple J named it 'Album of the Week' upon its release and added the new single, "Yo Mama" to high rotation at the station. The album was also nominated for the Best Independent Release ARIA Award.

Track listing
All songs written by Eddie Jacobson, except where noted
"Hook Up" (Eddie Jacobson, Damien Green, N. Grace) – 3:55
"Mandarines" – 3:57
"Everytime" (Jacobson, Dave Crane) – 4:23
"Yo Mama" (Jacobson, Crane) – 3:20
"Girl from Gore" – 2:21
"Is It Just Me" (Jacobson, Crane) – 3:37
"Hurt Me So Bad" – 5:14
"Sorry" – 2:54
"Piss on Ya" (featuring Monsta Mama) – 5:37
"Smell You on Me" (Jacobson, Crane) – 2:17
"Snatch and Grab" – 3:52
"I Love Work" – 4:13
"Speak Your Mind" – 3:42

Personnel

Butterfingers
 'Evil' Eddie Jacobson — vocals, guitar, samples, kazoo
 Damien Green — drums, vocals
 Olly Thomas — percussion, samples, vocals, kazoo
 Dave Crane — bass, vocals

Additional musicians
 Nick 1 — vocals ("Hook Up")
 Monsta Mama — vocals ("Piss on Ya")
 Crystal — horns ("Snatch and Grab" and "I Love Work")
 Selfy — horns ("Snatch and Grab" and "I Love Work")
 Lorraine — cello ("Hurt Me So Bad")
 Elysia Elation — vocals ("I Love Work")
 Matt Murphy — keyboards ("Hook Up")
 Tom Thum — vocals ("Mandarines")
 Deady Stigmata — vocals ("Yo Mama")

Production
 Magoo — Producer, Engineer, Mixer
 Damien Green — Engineer, Mixer
 Jack the Bear — Mastering

Charts

References

2004 debut albums
Butterfingers (Australian band) albums